Bentley is a ward in the metropolitan borough of Doncaster, South Yorkshire, England.  The ward contains 22 listed buildings that are recorded in the National Heritage List for England.  Of these, one is listed at Grade I, the highest of the three grades, and the others are at Grade II, the lowest grade.  The ward contains the suburb of Bentley, the villages of Almholme, Arksey, and Toll Bar, and the surrounding area.  There is a group of listed buildings in Arksey, including the church, the vicarage, the former school and its wall, a group of almshouses, a hall, and a pinfold.  Elsewhere, the listed buildings include another church, another pinfold, houses and cottages, a former watermill, farmhouses and farm buildings, a road causeway, a road bridge, and four mileposts.


Key

Buildings

References

Citations

Sources

 

Lists of listed buildings in South Yorkshire